Shaft in Africa is the soundtrack produced by Johnny Pate for the film Shaft in Africa and distributed for ABC Records in 1973.

Track listing

Side A 
 You Can't Even Walk in the Park (Opening Theme) – 2:30
 Are You Man Enough? (Main Title) by The Four Tops– 2:10
 Aleme Finds Shaft – 1:33
 Shaft in Africa (Addis) – 3:04
 Headman – 2:14
 El Jardia – 3:02

Side B 
Are You Man Enough? By the Four Tops – 3:24
 Jazar's Theme – 1:33
 Truck Stop – 2:15
 Aleme's Theme – 2:17
 El Jardia (Reprise) – 1:43
 Are You Man Enough? (End Title) by the Four Tops – 0:43

References 

1970s film soundtrack albums
Shaft (franchise)
Albums produced by Johnny Pate
1973 soundtrack albums
ABC Records soundtracks